This is a list of tennis players who have represented the Russia Davis Cup team in an official Davis Cup match. Russia have taken part in the competition since 1993. They competed as the Soviet Union (USSR) from 1962 to 1991 and the Commonwealth of Independent States (CIS) in 1992.

Russia players

CIS players

USSR players

References

Lists of Davis Cup tennis players
Davis